The Turkmenistan Futsal Cup, is the top knockout tournament of Turkmenistan futsal and the second most important futsal competition in Turkmenistan after the Turkmenistan Futsal League. It is organized by the Football Federation of Turkmenistan and was established in the 2018 season.

Cup Winners 
 2018: Denizchi Turkmenbashi
 2019: Migrasiya Ashgabat

Super Cup Winners 
 2019: Kopetdag Ashgabat

See also 

 AFC Futsal club championship
 Football Federation of Turkmenistan
 Turkmenistan national futsal team
 Turkmenistan Futsal League

References

External links 
 Turkmenistan Futsal

Futsal in Turkmenistan
National futsal cups
Recurring sporting events established in 2018
2018 establishments in Turkmenistan